Route 177 is a highway in Cape Girardeau County, Missouri, USA.  Its northern terminus is at U.S. Route 61 at Fruitland, Missouri; its southern terminus is at Route 34/Route 74 in Cape Girardeau.

Major intersections

References

177
Transportation in Cape Girardeau County, Missouri